The nuclear weapons tests of Pakistan refers to a test programme directed towards the development of nuclear explosives and  investigation of the effects of nuclear explosions. The programme was suggested by Munir Ahmad Khan, chairman of the Pakistan Atomic Energy Commission (PAEC), as early as 1977.

The first subcritical testing was carried out in 1983 by PAEC, codenamed Kirana-I, and continued until the 1990s under the government of the Prime Minister of Pakistan, Benazir Bhutto. Further claims of conducting subcritical tests at Kahuta were made in 1984 by the Kahuta Research Laboratories (KRL) but were dismissed by the Government of Pakistan.

The Pakistan Government, under Prime Minister Nawaz Sharif, authorized the programme jointly under PAEC and KRL, assisted by the Corps of Engineers in 1998. There were six nuclear tests performed under this programme, codenamed Chagai-I, and Chagai-II. After the Prime Minister of India, Atal Vajpayee made a state visit to Pakistan to meet with the Prime Minister of Pakistan, Nawaz Sharif, both countries signed a nuclear testing control treaty, the Lahore Declaration in 1999.

Testing series

Chagai-I

The Pakistan's Chagai-I nuclear test series was a single nuclear test conducted in 1998.

Chagai II

The Pakistan's Chagai II nuclear test series was a single nuclear test conducted in 1998. These tests followed the Chagai-I series .

The Pakistan test series summary table is below.

The detonations in the Pakistan's Chagai-II series are listed below:

Summary

References

Sources

 
 

Pakistani nuclear weapons testing
History of Pakistan
History of science and technology in Pakistan